Choudhury Mahmood Hasan (born 31 August 1953) is an expert in the field of natural products chemistry and former Vice-chancellor or Manarat International University. His father was Late Justice Md. Abdul Quddus Choudhury. He received his Bachelor of Pharmacy and Masters of Pharmacy from University of Dhaka in 1973 and 1974 respectively. Later on Commonwealth Scholarship he completed PhD in 1982 from the University of Strathclyde, United Kingdom. So far he has published more than 295 articles in peer-reviewed scientific journals.

He has served as:

Professor, Department of Pharmaceutical Chemistry, Univ. Dhaka, Bangladesh,  from 28th January 1978 to 30th June 2020. 
 Fellow, Bangladesh Academy of Sciences.
 Fellow Royal Society of Chemistry, United Kingdom
 Chairman, Department  of  Pharmacy, University of Dhaka, Bangladesh, from  6 June 1992 to  14 July 1993.
 Director, Directorate of Drug Administration, Ministry of Health & Family Welfare, Government of the People's Republic of Bangladesh, from 15 July 1993 to  9 January 1997.
 Dean, Faculty of Pharmacy, University of Dhaka, Bangladesh, from 1 October 1999 to 20 December 2003.
 Chairman, Bangladesh Council of Scientific and Industrial Research (BCSIR), from 11 August 2005 to 10 August 2008.
 Vice-chancellor, Manarat International University  (MIU), Dhaka, Bangladesh, from 13 October 2012 to 2016.

Awards
 Hakim  Habibur  Rahman Gold Medal; 2003, for outstanding contribution  in the  field  of medicinal plants research
 Bangladesh Academy  of  Sciences Gold  Medal; 2006, in Biological  Sciences (senior group) for significant contribution in the field of Plant Products Chemistry
 Chandraboty Gold Medal; 2007, for outstanding contribution in science.
 Atish Dipankar Gold Medal; 2008, for outstanding contribution in science.

References

Living people
1953 births
University of Dhaka alumni
Alumni of the University of Strathclyde
Fellows of Bangladesh Academy of Sciences
Academic staff of the University of Dhaka
Bangladeshi pharmacologists
Place of birth missing (living people)